Leno is a town and comune in the province of Brescia, in Lombardy, northern Italy.

Twin towns
 Cassino, Italy, since 2005

Sources

Cities and towns in Lombardy